Lampetia (minor planet designation: 393 Lampetia) is a fairly large main belt asteroid that was discovered by German astronomer Max Wolf on 4 November 1894 in Heidelberg. It has an unusually low rotation rate, with a period estimated at 38.7 hours and a brightness variation of 0.14 in magnitude.

In 2000, the asteroid was detected by radar from the Arecibo Observatory at a distance of 0.98 AU.

References

External links
 
 

Background asteroids
Lampetia
Lampetia
C-type asteroids (Tholen)
Xc-type asteroids (SMASS)
18941104